Károly Rezső Soó von Bere (1 August 1903, Székelyudvarhely (now Odorheiu Secuiesc, Romania) – 10 February 1980, Budapest) was a Hungarian botanist and professor at the University of Budapest.

He is best known for his work on:

Dactylorhiza cruenta (O.F.Müller) Soó (1962)
Dactylorhiza elata (Poiret) Soó (1962)
Dactylorhiza foliosa (Sol. ex E.N.Lowe) Soó (1962)
Dactylorhiza fuchsii (Druce) Soó (1962)
Dactylorhiza latifolia (L.) Soó (1962)
Dactylorhiza maculata (L.) Soó (1962)
Dactylorhiza praetermissa (Druce) Soó (1962)
Dactylorhiza romana (Sebastiani) Soó (1962)
Dactylorhiza saccifera (Brongn.) Soó (1962)
Dactylorhiza sambucina (L.) Soó (1962)
Dactylorhiza traunsteineri (Sauter) Soó (1962)

Bibliography
Geobotanische Monographie von Kolozsvár (Debrecen, 1927)
Monographie und lconographie der Orchideen Europas… (kunulauxtoro, Berlin, 1930–1940) (Nachdr. 1972)
Floren und Vegetationskarte des historischen Ungarns (Debrecen, 1933)
A Mátra hegység és környékének flórája (Debrecen, 1937)
A Tiszántúl flórája (Debrecen, 1938)
A Székelyföld flórájának elomunkálatai (Kolozsvár, 1940)
A Székelyföld flórája (Kolozsvár, 1943)
Magyar Flóramuvek (I-III., VI-VII., Debrecen és Kolozsvár, 1937–1949)
Kolozsvár és környékének flórája (Kolozsvár, 1941–44)
Növényföldrajz (Bp., 1945, 1965)
Az Erdélyi Mezoség flórája (Debrecen, 1949)
Közép-Erdély erdei növényszövetkezetei és azok jellemzo fajai (Sopron, 1948)
A magyar növényvilág kézikönyve (I-II., Jávorka Sándorral, Bp., 1951)
Fejlodéstörténeti növényrendszertan (Bp., 1953)
Növényföldrajz. Egyetemi tankönyv Soó, Rezso. Tankönyvkiadó, Budapest, (1963)
A magyar flóra és vegetáció rendszertani-növényföldrajzi kézikönyve (I-VI., Bp., 1964–80)
Magyar Flóra (Növényhatározó, II. köt. 4. kiad. Bp., 1968)
Bibliographia synoecologica scientifica hungarica, 1900–1972 (Bp., 1978).
A magyar flóra és vegetáció rendszertani-növényföldrajzi kézikönyve Soó, Rezso. I-VII. Akadémiai Kiadó, Budapest, (1964–1985)

Notes

References 

Máthé Imre: S. R., 1903–1980 (Botan. Közl., 1980);
Zólyomi Bálint: S. R., 1903–1980 (Magy. Tud., 1980);
Priszter Szaniszló: S. R. botanikai munkásságának bibliográfiája (A magyar flóra… kézikönyve VII., Bp., 1985);
Simon Tibor: S. R. 1903–1980 (Egy. L., 1980. 3. sz.);
Simon Tibor: A magyar flóra kézikönyve (Tudomány, 1986)

1980 deaths
1903 births
20th-century Hungarian botanists